Paradine v Jane [1647] EWHC KB J5 is an English contract law case which established absolute liability for contractual debts.

Facts
This action grew out of the  English Civil War.    Prince Rupert   was commander of the armies of his uncle,   King Charles I.    Forces on both sides often looted the estates of the   nobles   for the purpose of gaining supplies.    On July 19, 1643,   the British Royalist forces,  known as the   Cavaliers,   took possession of land owned by the plaintiff,  Paradine,  which was under lease  to the  defendant,  Jane.    The Royalists held the land for three years, finally relinquishing it in 1646 after the remaining Royalist resistance collapsed.

Paradine brought suit against Jane to recover for breach of the lease:

In debt the plaintiff declares upon a lease for years rendering rent at the four usual feasts; and for rent behind for three years, ending at the Feast of the Annunciation, 21 Car. [1646] brings his action; the defendant pleads, that a certain German prince, by name Prince Rupert, an alien born, enemy to the King and his kingdom, had invaded the realm with an hostile army of men; and with the same force did enter upon the defendant’s possession, and him expelled, and held out of possession from the 19 of July 18 Car. [1642] till the Feast of the Annunciation, 21 Car. whereby he could not take the profits; whereupon the plaintiff demurred, and the plea was resolved insufficient.

Judgment
The justices stated that even though in previous cases they would not allow a lessor to proceed against a lessee in time of war, Jane was still liable for the rent.

Criticism
In his book  The Death of Contract,  American  law professor  Grant Gilmore  suggests that both  English  and American judges broadened the principle set forth in  Paradine v. Jane  unnecessarily.  He argues that no legal system consistently held parties absolutely liable for the contracts they made,  and that the  holding  of Paradine itself is limited to its own circumstances,  meaning that either the defendant could not  counterclaim  his own plea against the  landlord’s  action for rent, or that the court considered the leasehold to be a fully executed transaction.

References

S Macaulay, J Kidwell and W Whitford,  Contracts: Law in Action (Matthew Bender Company, 2003)  
G Gilmore, The Death of Contract (Ohio State University Press 1974, 2nd edn 1995)

External links
 Full text of decision from BAILII.org
 Link to case from ContractsProf Blog

English contract case law
1647 in law
1647 in England
Court of King's Bench (England) cases